Setter is a surname. Notable people with the surname include:

Jane Setter  (born 1966), British phonetician
Rick Setter (born 1937), Australian politician
Richard Setter (before 1390–1422), English politician

See also
Sutter (surname)